The Afon Clywedog is an upland headwater tributary of the River Severn in Powys, Wales. It is approximately 29 km long and has its source on the flanks of Plynlimon and has its confluence with the Severn in Llanidloes. The annual rainfall over the catchment is between  1737 mm and 1836 mm.

River regulation
A large part of the upper catchment of the river is inundated by the Clywedog reservoir which stores water from the catchment, especially during the winter months, and releases it during periods of low flow to support the flow in the Severn so that drinking water may be abstracted downstream. The management rules also  enable the reservoir to maintain the reservoir below maximum level during the winter so that there is capacity to absorb flood flows to  reduce the impact of flooding further down the main river. The Afon Clywedog thus has a highly regulated flow with relatively high flow in dry conditions and reduced flow in wetter weather.

See also
 Bryntail lead mine
 List of rivers in Wales

References

External links

River regulation in Powys
Clywedog
Clywedog
1Clywedog